The Yutong E10, also sold as the longer Yutong E12, is a battery electric single-decker bus manufactured by Yutong in Zhengzhou since 2016 for both Chinese and international bus operators.

The Yutong E10 debuted in China in 2016, transporting delegates to meetings of the National People's Congress in Beijing.

Design
Both the Yutong E10 and Yutong E12 are powered by a 350kW electric motor capable of producing  of torque. Regenerative braking can also be used to extend the range of the bus by up to 40%. Both buses use ZF front and rear axles, the former using an independent suspension, as well as ZF electro-hydraulic power steering. The buses use an Electronically Controlled Air Suspension (ECAS) consisting of airbags in the front and rear of the bus, in addition to ZF SACHS shock absorbers.

In the United Kingdom, both buses can carry 70 passengers, with the E10 carrying 35 seated and 36 standing passengers and the E12 carrying 39 seated and 31 standing passengers. Wheelchair access is provided on both buses as standard.

Exports

The Yutong E12 is popular in the Nordic countries. The city of Roskilde in Denmark received its first Yutong buses in 2019, replacing its diesel bus fleet with 20 E12s. The cities of Copenhagen and Odense, as well as Bergen in Denmark, who all have bus services run by Keolis soon followed, with each city receiving deliveries of Yutong E12s throughout 2020 and 2021. 14 Yutong E12s were also delivered for service in Iceland's capital city of Reykjavik in November 2018, while 35 E12s were delivered to both the Finnish capital of Helsinki and neighbouring Kerava in 2019. 

In Poland, nine E10s were delivered to the city of Polkowice in 2021, twelve E12s were delivered to the city of Łomża in 2022, and 20 E12s have been ordered by the city of Białystok. E12s have also been delivered to Bulgaria, with 20 E12s delivered to the capital Sofia in December 2018 and 14 delivered to Pleven in December 2021, enabling the latter to be Bulgaria's first city with an all-electric bus fleet. An E12 demonstrator was trialled by Keolis in the French city of Orléans in 2017. 

100 Yutong E12s were ordered for bus operators in Santiago de Chile in 2018, as part of a scheme seeking to electrify the city's bus network by 2050, while Singapore's Land Transport Authority took delivery of 20 E12s as part of an order of 60 electric single-decker buses for the city in April 2020.

In Australia, the Yutong E12 has proven popular with many bus operators around the country who opted to trial the vehicle. Nine Yutong E12s were delivered to Interline Bus Services from April 2021, a small fleet was delivered to Transit Systems NSW, and eight E12s began entering service with ACTION of Canberra from February 2023. E12s were also ordered by New Zealand operator Go Bus Transport, with nine delivered to Auckland for its 'Airporter' services serving Auckland Airport in January 2021 and an additional three delivered for services in Christchurch later in the year.

United Kingdom

Yutong E10s and E12s, as well as other Yutong products, have been sold in the United Kingdom through the Pelican Bus dealership in Castleford since 2018, where a factory assembling complete knock-down Yutong buses and coaches will soon open. The company is also partnered with battery supplier Zenobe, who assist in installing charging infrastructure and providing new batteries for electric bus operators.

The first ten Yutong E10s ordered for the United Kingdom market entered service with Go North East in November 2020. These Yutongs were branded as Voltra buses for services on routes 53 and 54 between Newcastle upon Tyne and Gateshead, with the launch preceded by a major marketing campaign by Go North East, and were delivered with high-specification interiors and exterior LED lighting designed by Best Impressions. Go North East would subsequently take delivery of nine E12s delivered to Voltra specification for use on the QuayCity Q3 service in September 2022. Nine E10s were also delivered to First Leeds in 2020, entering service on a route serving the Halton Moor district of Leeds in October.

In Leicester, fifteen E12s were ordered by Leicester City Council, with eleven delivered to Roberts Travel Group in February 2021 for use on the city's park & ride services and the remaining four delivered to Centrebus in June 2022 for 'Hospital Hopper' services to the University Hospitals of Leicester. Centrebus would subsequently take delivery of six E10s in October 2022, the first zero-emissions buses to be delivered through a Department for Transport-funded Zero Emission Bus Regional Areas (ZEBRA) scheme, for use on its 'Orbital' network across Leicester; a further fourteen electric buses are planned to be delivered for this service.

Nottingham City Transport have ordered twelve E12s for delivery to their Trent Bridge garage in 2023, the first of a planned 78 electric buses to replace the operator's existing single-deck fleet. 

Shortly before the 2021 United Nations Climate Change Conference in Glasgow, Scottish bus operator McGill's received 55 E12s, which were followed by 41 more of the type, 31 of these being E12s and the remaining ten being McGill's first short E10s, in March 2023; McGill's Yutong electric fleet of 96 buses is the biggest order so far of Yutong electric buses in the United Kingdom. Elsewhere in Scotland, First Aberdeen have ordered 24 E12s for delivery in 2023, which will make the First Aberdeen fleet 50% zero-emission upon delivery, while 25 E10s were delivered to Stagecoach Highlands for services in Inverness in early 2023.

In Wales, after purchasing a demonstrator vehicle from Yutong in 2019, Newport Bus ordered 14 E12s in 2020, the first electric buses to be purchased by a Welsh bus operator, taking delivery of another five E12s and eleven E10s in 2022 and ordering 12 more E10s and E12s for delivery in 2023. E12s also entered service with Cardiff Bus in December 2021, with 36 being delivered with special branding for routes around Cardiff. An E12 from this batch was painted into a heritage livery celebrating 120 years of public transport in the Welsh capital. Eight E12s are to be delivered for electrification of the TrawsCymru T1 service serving Aberystwyth and Carmarthen in early 2023, while six E12s were delivered in 2021 for use on both the T22 service, serving Caernarfon and Blaenau Ffestiniog via Porthmadog, and the T19 service, serving Blaenau Ffestiniog and Llandudno, but have yet to enter service.

References

External links 
  
 

Low-floor buses
Battery electric buses
Vehicles introduced in 2016
Buses of China